Valber may refer to:

 Válber (footballer, born 1967), full name Válber Roel de Oliveira, Brazilian football defender
 Válber (footballer, born 1971), full name Válber da Silva Costa, Brazilian football striker
 Válber (footballer, born 1981), full name Válber Mendes Ferreira, Brazilian football attacking midfielder
 Valber Huerta (born 1993), Chilean football centre-back